Kamaljit Singh Paul is a US-based Indian neurosurgeon known for his expertise in the treatment of epilepsy, tremors and Parkinson's disease. He holds 19 US patents including 12 patents for surgical devices. A recipient of the Punjab Gaurav Sanman in 2001 from the Government of Punjab and twice winner of the Patients' Choice Award in 2008 ad 2009, Paul was honored by the Government of India, in 2002, with the fourth highest Indian civilian award of Padma Shri.

References

Recipients of the Padma Shri in medicine
Indian neurosurgeons
Living people
American people of Punjabi descent
American people of Indian descent
20th-century Indian medical doctors
Year of birth missing (living people)
20th-century surgeons